John Wilson (born 4 July 1968) is an English prelate of the Catholic Church, the Metropolitan Archbishop of Southwark. He had previously served as an auxiliary bishop in the Archdiocese of Westminster (2016–2019).

Early life

Wilson was born on 4 July 1968 in Sheffield, West Riding of Yorkshire, England. Baptised into the Church of England, he converted to Roman Catholicism at the age of 16 in 1985. He studied at University of Leeds, where he studied for a bachelor's degree in theology and religious studies. He then undertook studies for the priesthood at the Venerable English College, Rome. During his seminary training he completed a Baccalaureate in Sacred Theology at the Pontifical Gregorian University and a Licence in Moral Theology at the Alphonsian Academy.

Ordained ministry

Wilson was ordained to the priesthood on 29 July 1995 for the Diocese of Leeds. After doing pastoral work from 1995 to 1999, Wilson began teaching moral theology at St Cuthbert's Seminary, Ushaw College, Durham, in 1999, then latterly served as Vice-Rector; he also completed a PhD at Durham University. In 2005, he was appointed Episcopal Vicar for Evangelisation in the Diocese of Leeds, a role he held until 2012. From 2008 to 2014 he was also sessional chaplain at HMP Leeds. In 2011 he was named a Chaplain to His Holiness by Pope Benedict XVI. During the vacancy of the See, he was elected Administrator of the Diocese of Leeds by the College of Consultors from September 2012 to November 2014. From 2015 to 2016 he served as Parish Priest of St Martin de Porres, Wakefield.

Episcopate
On 24 November 2015 Wilson was appointed an Auxiliary bishop in the Archdiocese of Westminster and Titular Bishop of Lindisfarne by Pope Francis.

He was ordained to the episcopate by Cardinal Vincent Nichols on the Feast of the Conversion of St Paul, 25 January 2016. He had pastoral care of the deaneries in the western area of the diocese. He was also Chair of the Education Commission and had oversight of ecumenical work and inter-religious dialogue at diocesan level. He was also responsible for Liturgy, Art and Architecture, as well as the Historic Churches Commission.

On 10 June 2019 Wilson was appointed Archbishop of Southwark by Pope Francis upon the retirement of Archbishop Peter Smith. His installation took place in St George's Cathedral, Southwark, on 25 July 2019.

On 8 May 2021, he was appointed KC*HS (Knight Commander of the
Equestrian Order of the Holy Sepulchre of Jerusalem, with Star) and installed as the Grand Prior of the Lieutenancy of England and Wales of the Order of the Holy Sepulchre.

References

External links
 Catholic Church in England & Wales
 Catholic-Hierarchy

1968 births
Living people
Alumni of the University of Leeds
Alumni of Durham University
Clergy from Sheffield
Roman Catholic archbishops of Southwark
21st-century Roman Catholic archbishops in the United Kingdom
People associated with the University of Leeds
Pontifical Gregorian University alumni
Converts to Roman Catholicism from Anglicanism
English Roman Catholic archbishops